Delmenhorst is a railway station located in Delmenhorst, Germany. The station is located on the Oldenburg–Bremen railway and Delmenhorst–Hesepe railway. The train services are operated by Deutsche Bahn and NordWestBahn. The station has been part of the Bremen S-Bahn since December 2010.

Train services
The following services currently call at the station:

Intercity services (IC 56) Norddeich - Emden - Oldenburg - Bremen - Hanover - Braunschweig - Magdeburg - Leipzig - Dresden
Regional services  Norddeich - Emden - Oldenburg - Bremen - Nienburg - Hanover
Local services  Osnabrück - Bramsche - Vechta - Delmenhorst - Bremen
Bremen S-Bahn services  Bad Zwischenahn - Oldenburg - Delmenhorst - Bremen
Bremen S-Bahn services  Nordenham - Hude - Delmenhorst - Bremen

References

External links 
 

Railway stations in Lower Saxony
Bremen S-Bahn